The title Duke and Prince of Paliano is borne by the head of the elder line of the Colonna family. At times the honour has been borne by several members at once. The Princes also bear many other titles and honorifics.

The Princes of Summonte are a cadet branch of the Princes of Paliano.

Lords of Paliano
Lorenzo Onofrio I Colonna (1417-1423)
Antonio Colonna (1423–1471) - son of Lorenzo Onofrio
Pietro Antonio Colonna (1471 -  ) - son of Antonio 
Prospero Colonna (1423–1463) - brother of Antonio
Odoardo Colonna (1423–1485) - brother of Antonio
Marcantonio I Colonna (1485–1522) - son of Pietro Antonio
Vespasiano Colonna (1522–1528) - grandson of Antonio; son of the condottiero Prospero Colonna
Fabrizio I Colonna (1485–1519) - son of Odoardo

Dukes of Paliano 
Fabrizio I Colonna (1519–1520)
Ascanio Colonna (1520–1556) - son of Fabrizio I
Giovanni Carafa (1556–1559) - nephew of Pope Paul IV

Duke-Princes of Paliano 
Marcantonio II Colonna (1559–1585) - son of Ascanio
Marcantonio III Colonna (1585–1595) - grandson of Marcantonio II
Marcantonio IV Colonna (1595–1611) - son of Marcantonio III
Filippo I Colonna (1611–1639) - brother of Marcantonio III
Girolamo Colonna (1639–1666) - son of Filippo I, contested by brother Frederico
Marcantonio V Colonna (1639–1659) - brother of Girolamo and son of Filippo I. Prince while his brothers fought over the Duchy.
Lorenzo Onofrio II Colonna (1659/66–1689) - son of Marcantonio V
Filippo II Colonna (1689–1714) - son of Lorenzo Onofrio II
Fabrizio II Colonna (1714–1755) - son of Filippo II
Lorenzo II Colonna (1755–1787) - son of Fabrizio II
Filippo III Giuseppe Colonna (1787–1818) - son of Lorenzo II
Aspreno I Colonna (1818–1847) - brother of Filippo III
Giovanni Andrea Colonna (1847–1894) - son of Aspreno I
Marcantonio VI Colonna (1894–1912) - son of Giovanni Andrea
Fabrizio III Colonna (1912–1923) - brother of Marcantonio VI
Marcantonio VII Colonna (1923–1947) - son of Fabrizio III
Aspreno II Colonna (1947–1987) - son of Marcantonio VII
Marcantonio VIII Colonna (1948– ) - son of Aspreno II

References and Notes

Paliano, Princes of